Tim Caple is a British television sports commentator. He is best known for his football and boxing commentary although has commentated on many different sports. He has broadcast for BBC, ITV, Channel 4, Channel 5, Sky Sports, Eurosport, ESPN, Al Jazeera, Canal+ and Globo International. He has also been featured as an in-videogame commentator for the Winter Olympics.

Football 

Tim Caple has worked as a TV and radio football commentator since the early 1990s.  In that time he has commentated numerous channels and networks, including the BBC, ITV and Channels 4 and 5. In 2013, he can be heard on ESPN, BT Sport and Eurosport.

He has covered every major Club and International Football event around the globe including World Cups and the Champions League.

Olympics

Tim is also a major commentator during Eurosport's coverage of the Summer and Winter Olympics, as well as the Paralympic Games.

In addition to this he has covered the World Athletics Championships from 1997 to the present day as well as a multitude
of other events from world championship boxing to fencing and archery.

Tim Caple has also commentated on the Winter Olympics PlayStation 2 game  Winter Sports: The Ultimate Challenge.

PokerFace 
Caple became the commentator on PokerFace, on ITV in 2006 and in 2007.

External links 
voice123.com/timcaple
timcaple.com

Living people
British association football commentators
1964 births
Television personalities from Bristol